Cața is a commune in Brașov County, Transylvania, Romania. It is composed of five villages: Beia, Cața, Drăușeni, Ionești, and Paloș. There are three fortified churches in the commune, at Cața, Beia, and Drăușeni.

The commune is located in the northernmost part of the county, on the border with Harghita and Mureș counties. At the 2011 census, 44.9% of inhabitants were Romanians, 30.9% Hungarians, and 23.4% Roma.

Gallery

References 

Communes in Brașov County
Localities in Transylvania